The Kastelberg  is the fourth highest summit of the Vosges Mountains. It is located on the former border between the French regions of Alsace and Lorraine.

Etymology 

In German Kastelberg means mountain of the castle.

Geography 

The mountain is divided between the French municipalities of La Bresse (dep. of Vosges, Lorraine) and Metzeral (dep. of Haut-Rhin, Alsace).
Nearby the mountain, on its Lorraine side, there is the ski resort of La Bresse, which offers an area served by skilifts ranging from 650 metres to 1350 metres as well as 50 km of cross country ski trails.

A locality of the Kastelberg named Wormsawald-Ammelthal (literally swallow's nest) harbours the most sturdy snowfield of the Vosges, which usually lasts up to July or, remarkably, to August.)

See also 
 Hohneck
 Vosges Mountains

References 

Mountains of Vosges (department)
Mountains of Haut-Rhin
One-thousanders of France
Mountains of the Vosges